QE4 may refer to:
 The fourth round of quantitative easing exhibited by the Federal Reserve since September 2019
 A mod for Quake III